She, a Chinese is a 2009 international co-production drama film directed by Xiaolu Guo. Inspired by Jean-Luc Godard's La Chinoise, it portraits a fragmented journey of a young Chinese woman through the world.  It won the 2009 Golden Leopard at the Locarno Film Festival.

Plot 
In 12 chapters, Mei escapes from her village in Sichuan province to a big city. She moves from job to job, man to man, and reaches the UK. She wanders in the streets. The sea is calling her. She gazes at the other side of the water as if towards her younger self.

Filming 
The film was shot in Chongqing, China, in London, and on the coast of Essex in eastern England.

Cast 
 Huang Lu - Li Mei
 Wei Yi Bo - 'Spikey'
 Geoffrey Hutchings - Geoffrey Hunt
 Chris Ryman - Rachid
 Hsinyi Liu - London Tour Guide

Release 
It was released by StudioCanal UK (formerly Optimum Releasing) and the Channel 4. The film was premiered at the Locarno Film Festival as well as Toronto Film Festival 2009 with positive reviews.

References

External links 

www.hollywoodreporter.com/movies/movie-reviews/chinese-film-review-93419/

2009 drama films
2009 films
Films directed by Xiaolu Guo